This is a list of individual test match and international match results of the British and Irish Lions.

South Africa 1891

South Africa 1896

Australia 1899

South Africa 1903

Australia & New Zealand 1904

New Zealand 1908

Argentina 1910

South Africa 1910

South Africa 1924

Argentina 1927

New Zealand & Australia 1930

Argentina 1936

South Africa 1938

New Zealand, Australia & Ceylon 1950

South Africa & Kenya 1955

Australia & New Zealand 1959

South Africa & Kenya 1962

Australia, New Zealand & Canada 1966

South Africa 1968

Australia & New Zealand 1971

South Africa 1974

New Zealand & Fiji 1977

South Africa 1980

New Zealand 1983

Rest of the World 1986

Australia 1989

France 1989
No test caps awarded

New Zealand 1993

South Africa 1997

Australia 2001

New Zealand 2005

South Africa 2009

Australia 2013

New Zealand 2017

South Africa 2021

Test record

External links
 British and Irish Lions History & Full Match Results

 
Test Matches